The following is a timeline of the history of the city of Beira, Mozambique.

19th century
 1891 - Beira established by Portuguese colonial Companhia de Moçambique.
 1898 - Umtali-Beira railway begins operating.
 1899 - Salisbury-Beira railway begins operating.

20th century
 1920 - Gorongosa Hunting Reserve created in vicinity of Beira.
 1924 - Clube Ferroviário da Beira (football club) formed.
 1925 - Catholic Our Lady of the Rosary church built.
 1940 - Roman Catholic diocese of Beira established.
 1941 - Beira becomes part of Portuguese East Africa.
 1943 - Atlético Desportivo Moma, Estrella Beira, and GD da Companhia Têxtil do Punguè football clubs formed.
 1946 - City expansion plan created by José Porto and Ribeiro Alegre.
 1952 - Beira Airport opens.
 1954 - Grande Hotel Beira and Cine-Teatro São Jorge (cinema) in business.
 1955 -  (school) established.
 1965 -  (railway station) and Associação Comercial building constructed.
 1970 - Population: 113,770.
 1975 - Beira becomes part of newly independent Mozambique.
 1980 - Population: 230,744.
 1988 - September: Catholic pope visits city.
 1997 - Population: 412,588.
 1998 - Chivavice Muchangage becomes mayor.
 2000
 February: Cyclone Leon–Eline occurs.
 February–March: 2000 Mozambique flood occurs.

21st century
 2003 - Daviz Simango becomes mayor.
 2006 - Municipiobeira.gov.mz website launched (approximate date).
 2015 - Population: 460,904 (estimate).

See also
 Beira history
 Timeline of Maputo
 History of Mozambique

References

This article incorporates information from the Portuguese Wikipedia and German Wikipedia.

Bibliography

External links

  (Bibliography)
 Items related to Beira, various dates (via Europeana)
 Items related to Beira, various dates (via Digital Public Library of America)
  (Bibliography)
  (Bibliography of open access articles)

Images

Beira, Mozambique
Beira
History of Mozambique
Years in Mozambique
Mozambique-related lists